Zhongcun is a metro station on Line 6 of the Hangzhou Metro in China. It was opened on 30 December 2020, together with the Line 6. It is located in the Fuyang District of Hangzhou.

References 

Railway stations in China opened in 2020
Hangzhou Metro stations